The Netherlands Armed Forces in Suriname (Troepenmacht in Suriname; TRIS) was the military force maintained by the Kingdom of the Netherlands in its colony of Suriname (later known as the constituent country of Suriname), in the area that is now independent Republic of Suriname.

History 
Units from the Dutch Caribbean existed in the Royal Netherlands Army even before 1814. In 1815, the 10th and 11th battalions were created and participated in the Battle of Waterloo, the final battle of the Napoleonic Wars. In 1821, the 10th and 11th battalions were renamed 27th and 28th battalions. They were then combined into one 27th Battalion, which on 16 October 1868 was split into two divisions. The first is the "Troops of the Colonial Authorities on Curaçao", whose task was to defend Curaçao and Dependencies (later known as the Netherlands Antilles); the second is the "Colonial Forces in Suriname", whose task was to protect Suriname. These units were placed under the authority of the Ministry of the Colonies.
In 1929 they participated in the suppression of the riots on the island of Curaçao.

The 2,000 American troops stationed in Suriname during World War II to protect the bauxite industry and to guard against a Vichy French invasion, were placed under the command of the militia. 

In 1957, units of the Dutch colonial forces in Suriname were transferred from the Ministry of the Colonies to the Armed forces of the Netherlands.
Following the declaration of Suriname's independence on 25 November 1975, the Colonial Forces were disbanded and many members of these units joined the newly created Surinamese Armed Forces (renamed the Suriname National Army in 1980).

See also 
 Royal Netherlands East Indies Army

References

Bibliography 
 H. Ringoir De Nederlandse Infanterie. Bussum, C.A.J van Dishoeck, 1968.

External links 
  Website TRIS Online
  Website Stichting Triskontakten

Dutch colonisation of the Guianas
Netherlands–Suriname relations
Military history of Suriname
Military history of the Netherlands
Military units and formations of the Netherlands
Military units and formations of the Napoleonic Wars
1868 establishments in the Netherlands
1975 disestablishments in the Netherlands
Military units and formations established in 1868
Military units and formations disestablished in 1975